Romina Bell (born 14 May 1993) is an Austrian football defender, currently playing for FC Neunkirch in the Swiss Nationalliga A.

She played for SV Neulengbach in the ÖFB-Frauenliga from 2008 to 2012, when she moved to the USA and played for the AIC Yellow Jackets. In 2016, she joined FC Neunkirch of the Swiss Nationalliga A.

She has also played for the Austria women's national football team at under-17, under-19 and senior level.

She has a Bachelor of Arts in English from the American International College.

References

1993 births
Living people
Austrian women's footballers
Austria women's international footballers
SV Neulengbach (women) players
FC Neunkirch players
Austrian expatriate women's footballers
Austrian expatriate sportspeople in the United States
Austrian expatriate sportspeople in Switzerland
Expatriate women's soccer players in the United States
Expatriate women's footballers in Switzerland
People from Tulln an der Donau
Women's association football defenders
American International Yellow Jackets women's soccer players
American International College alumni
ÖFB-Frauenliga players
Swiss Women's Super League players